Coral Ridge Mall is an enclosed super-regional shopping mall located just south of Interstate 80 in Coralville, Iowa. The mall's primary trade area includes Iowa City, Cedar Rapids, and other parts of eastern Iowa. It is owned and managed by Brookfield Properties, which acquired the  original developer of the mall, General Growth Properties, in 2018.

The mall has a total floor area of 1,187,097 square feet (110,285 m2), with a gross leasable area of 979,415 square feet (90,991 m2). It also features a 1,000-seat food court with Wi-Fi internet access, a large "antique" carousel, a children's play area, and an NHL regulation-sized ice rink. While the ice rink is primarily used for public skating, the University of Iowa Hawkeyes hockey team plays most of its home games there.

The mall's anchor stores are PetSmart, Tuesday Morning, Marshalls, Barnes & Noble, Dillard's, Ashley HomeStore, Marcus Cinema, The Iowa Children's Museum, Best Buy, Target, H&M, Scheels All Sports, JCPenney, Old Navy, Shoe Dept. Encore, Five Below, Ulta Beauty, HomeGoods, and Planet Fitness.

History
Coral Ridge Mall opened on July 29, 1998, with 100% of its floor space leased. It attracted one million visitors in its first 30 days and continues to attract roughly 10 million visitors a year. It also spawned additional retail development at the interchange of I-80 and Iowa Highway 965, now known as Coral Ridge Avenue. Big-box stores such as Kohl's, Lowe's, Dressbarn and a Wal-Mart Supercenter (currently branded as simply Walmart) have opened in the years following Coral Ridge's opening.

In 2013 Sears closed. Spirit Halloween has taken the former space for the 2015 season, originally Halloween Boutique, then they took the former Shoe Carnival space by the mall for the 2016 and 2017 season, then they took the former Younkers for the 2018 season, and then they took the former LOFT for the 2019 season.

In July 2016, the former Sears was demolished to make way for six new stores.

In January 2017, Hollister Co. permanently closed at Coral Ridge Mall.  It was later announced that Victoria's Secret would expand into the Hollister space.

In April 2017, Coral Ridge announced HomeGoods, Marshalls, PetSmart and Ulta Beauty opens in September.

On April 18, 2018 it was announced that Younkers will close, as the parent, Bon-Ton Stores, is going out of business.

On August 29, 2018 Younkers closed its doors permanently. The mall has four anchors remaining.

On January 19, 2019 Iowa's last Abercrombie & Fitch located at Coral Ridge Mall closed permanently.

In March 2019 Five Below opens.

In November 2019 Ashley HomeStore opens in former Younkers.

In January 2020 Pier 1, which is by the mall, closed and Spirit Halloween took that spot for the 2020 season.

On February 21, 2020 Tuesday Morning opens.

In May 2020 Forever 21 closed peramently and Scheels expanded to that spot along with Claire's, relocated to the former Motherhood Maternity, GameStop, Auntie Anne's, Riddle's Jewelry, relocated to the former Wet Seal and Aveda, bareMinerals, and Tradehome Shoes.

In September 2020 Eddie Bauer relocated to the former Banana Republic.

Windsor plans to open a location in the former Charlotte Russe.

H&M plans to open a location in the former Gap, Eddie Bauer, and LOFT.

Economic impact
When Coral Ridge Mall was planned, Iowa City business owners were concerned that the mall would take business away from them. While taxable sales in Coralville increased from $171.2 million in 1998 to $314.6 million in 1999, sales in Iowa City increased from $701.1 million to $733.3 million in that same period. By 2006 taxable sales in Coralville would grow to $549.7 million while sales in Iowa City grew to $901.4 million. However, a 2000 report by Iowa State University economics professor Kenneth Stone stated that 18 eastern Iowa counties lost over $120 million in retail sales to Johnson County in Coral Ridge's first year. In addition, despite the overall increase in taxable sales, general merchandise and apparel sales in Iowa City declined between 1997 and 2007.

Several malls in eastern Iowa, including Old Capitol Mall in downtown Iowa City and Westdale Mall in Cedar Rapids, saw an increased number of store closings after Coral Ridge Mall opened. Most of Coral Ridge Mall's anchors, except for Younkers and Dillard's, relocated from other shopping centers in the Iowa City area; Younkers ran two stores in Johnson County before closing its Old Capitol Mall store in January 2005. By 2008, Old Capitol Mall and Sycamore Mall in Iowa City would rebound to 95 percent occupancy under local ownership while downtown Iowa City merchants began to focus on specialty retail.

Coral Ridge Mall was built in a tax increment financing district. The Des Moines Register reported on August 13, 2006, that the city of Coralville was using the $7 million in property taxes generated by the mall to pay off long-term debts on a new hotel and convention center instead of using it for local services.

Incidents at Coral Ridge Mall
On September 3, 2003, during routine structural checks, officials discovered someone had been secretly growing marijuana near the mall's ceiling. No plants themselves were found but growing lights, gardening pots, and seeds were found in the roof space above one of the tenants. The amount of marijuana that had been grown could not be determined. The perpetrator faced an additional five years to their prison sentence due to the proximity of the Iowa Children's Museum in Coral Ridge Mall.

On June 12, 2015, at approximately 7:30PM, a 20-year-old woman who worked at the Iowa Children's Museum was shot at her place of employment near the food court area. She was transported to University of Iowa Hospitals and Clinics where she died a short time later. An eyewitness, who worked at a kiosk in the mall, said the shooter was a mall security guard who had allegedly been fired for harassing the victim earlier in the day.

References

External links
 Coral Ridge Mall web site
 Coral Ridge Ice Arena
 Iowa Children's Museum

Brookfield Properties
Shopping malls in Iowa
Buildings and structures in Johnson County, Iowa
Shopping malls established in 1998
Tourist attractions in Johnson County, Iowa
Coralville, Iowa